Nesodden Idrettsforening is a Norwegian sports club from Nesodden. It has sections for association football, athletics, basketball, table tennis, fencing, orienteering, skiing and speed skating.

Founded on 24 July 1920, their home field is Berger stadion. The club colors are black and white. The handball section broke away in 1992 to form Nesodden HK.

The men's football team is playing in the Fifth division for the 2023-season. The club played in the Second Division between 2011 and 2013. Their best known player is Jonas Krogstad.

Recent history 
{|class="wikitable"
|-bgcolor="#efefef"
! Season
! 
! Pos.
! Pl.
! W
! D
! L
! GS
! GA
! P
!Cup
!Notes
|-
|2009
|3. divisjon
|align=right |2
|align=right|22||align=right|14||align=right|4||align=right|4
|align=right|63||align=right|35||align=right|46
||Second qualifying round
|
|-
|2010
|3. divisjon
|align=right bgcolor=#DDFFDD| 1
|align=right|20||align=right|16||align=right|1||align=right|3
|align=right|79||align=right|25||align=right|49
||First qualifying round
|Promoted to the 2. divisjon
|-
|2011 
|2. divisjon
|align=right |6
|align=right|26||align=right|13||align=right|2||align=right|11
|align=right|53||align=right|44||align=right|41
||Second round
|
|-
|2012
|2. divisjon
|align=right |7
|align=right|26||align=right|9||align=right|7||align=right|10
|align=right|40||align=right|47||align=right|34
||First round
|
|-
|2013
|2. divisjon
|align=right bgcolor="#FFCCCC"| 14
|align=right|26||align=right|4||align=right|4||align=right|18
|align=right|23||align=right|73||align=right|16
||First round
|Relegated
|}

References

External links 
 Official site 

Football clubs in Norway
Sport in Akershus
Association football clubs established in 1920
Athletics clubs in Norway
Orienteering clubs in Norway
Speed skating clubs in Norway
Defunct Norwegian handball clubs
1920 establishments in Norway